Finis Farr (December 31, 1904 – January 3, 1982) was an American writer and biographer.

Works
 Frank Lloyd Wright (1961), biography of an architect Frank Lloyd Wright (Charles Scribner's Sons)
 Black Champion: The Life and Times of Jack Jackson (1964), biography of the boxer Jack Johnson
 The Elephant Valley (1967)
 FDR (1972), biography of Franklin D. Roosevelt (Arlington House)
 O'Hara: A Biography (1973), biography of John O'Hara (Little, Brown and Company)
 Chicago: A Personal History of America's Most American City (1973) (Arlington House)
 Fair enough: The life of Westbrook Pegler (1975), biography of Westbrook Pegler (Artington House)
 Margaret Mitchell of Atlanta: the author of Gone With the Wind (1976), biography of Margaret Mitchell (Avon)
 Richenbacker's Luck: An American Life (1979), biography of Eddie Rickenbacker

1904 births
1982 deaths
20th-century American biographers